Statistics of Liberian Premier League for the 2002 season.

Overview
It was contested by 16 teams, and Liberia Petroleum Refining Company Oilers won the championship.

Group stage

Group A

Group B

Final
Top 4 clubs only

Football competitions in Liberia
Lea